Hilliard is both a surname and a given name. Notable people with the name include:

Surname
 Asa Grant Hilliard III (1933–2007), African American professor of educational psychology
 Benjamin C. Hilliard (1868–1951), U.S. Representative from Colorado
 Bob Hilliard (1918–1971), American lyricist
 Brent Hilliard (born 1970), American volleyball player
 Colm Hilliard (1936–2002), Irish Fianna Fáil Party politician
 Corey Hilliard (born 1985), American football offensive tackle
 Dalton Hilliard (born 1964), former American football player
 Daniel Hilliard (died 1888), Ontario merchant and political figure
 Darrun Hilliard (born 1993), American basketball player for Maccabi Tel Aviv of the Israeli Basketball Premier League
 David Hilliard (1942-), Chief of Staff of the Black Panther Party
 David Hilliard (photographer) (born 1964), American photographer
 Dontrell Hilliard (born 1995), American football player
 Earl F. Hilliard (born 1942), American politician and former congressman
 Edward Hilliard (MP) (c. 1754–1815), English barrister and Member of Parliament
 Edward Hilliard (1851–1936, American Seventh-day Adventist missionary
 Ernest Hilliard (1890–1947), American actor
 George Hilliard (1827–1892), Canadian businessman and politician
 Harry Hilliard (1826–1914), Australian cricketer
 Henry Washington Hilliard (1808–1892), U.S. Representative from Alabama 
 Ike Hilliard (born 1976), professional American football player, nephew of Dalton Hilliard
 Irwin Foster Hilliard (born 1863), Ontario lawyer and political figure
 Isaac H. Hilliard (1811-1868), American planter and cotton factor in the Antebellum South
 John Hilliard (artist) (born 1945), London-based conceptual artist, photographer and academic
 John Kenneth Hilliard (1901–1989), American acoustic and electrical engineer, loudspeaker designer, researcher
 John Northern Hilliard (1872–1935), American author of a best-selling book on magic
 John S. Hilliard (born 1947), American composer
 Justin Hilliard (born 1998), American football player
 Lawrence Hilliard (1582–1640), English miniature painter (son of Nicholas Hilliard)
 Lex Hilliard (born 1984), American football running back
Mary Ann Hilliard (1860-1950), Irish nurse and suffragette
 Michael Hilliard (1903–1982), Irish politician
 Nicholas Hilliard (1537–1619), English miniature painter (father of Lawrence Hilliard)
 Nicholas Hilliard (judge) (born 1959), British judge
 Olive Mary Hilliard (1925–2022), South African botanist and taxonomist
 Randy Hilliard (born 1967), American football defensive back
 Robert Hilliard (1904–1937), Irish boxer
 Sam Hilliard (born 1994), American baseball player
 William A. Hilliard (1927-2017), American journalist

Given name
 Hilliard Brooke Bell (1897–1960), Canadian World War I flying ace
 Hilliard Beyerstein (1907–1990), Canadian politician
 Hilliard Gates (1915–1996), American radio sports announcer
 Hilliard P. Jenkins (1922–1992), American farmer, philanthropist, and civic leader
 Hilliard Lyle (1879–1931), Canadian lacrosse player
 Hilliard Mitchell (1852–1923), Canadian politician
 Hilliard A. Wilbanks (1933–1967), United States Air Force officer and Medal of Honor recipient